Australian rules football in Ireland began in 1999 when clubs were simultaneously formed in Dublin and Belfast, however awareness of the sport dates back to the first tours by Australian teams in late 1967 and the country  subsequently became a source of players for professional leagues in Australia through the Irish Experiment.
 
While coexisting with and relying heavily on players from Gaelic games, the sport has grown and Ireland has become one of the most decorated nations in Australian rules with the national team, formed in 2001, winning second most men's international titles (2) and most women's international titles (2) as well as the most European Championship titles (2) and Euro Cup women's titles (4). 

The sport in Ireland is governed by AFL Ireland which is a member of AFL Europe.

History
One could argue that the Irish have been playing Australian rules as early as the 1870s, as recent evidence suggests that a form of football being played in south western Ireland at the time was played under Victorian rules in a fashion indistinguishable from that of the game played in Australia, and early on it was even played with a rugby ball, with a mark for catching the ball and with upright posts of the Australian game. It is not known how or when the Victorian rules were introduced to Ireland, however its legacy can be found in the written rules of the Commercials Club of County Limerick from the early 1880s which later, along with elements of soccer, formed the basis for Gaelic Football.

Primarily Irish historians analysing accounts of the traditional Irish football caid and Gaelic Athletic Association codified rules against the Melbourne Football Club rules of 1959 and Victorian Rules of 1866 and 1877 and those of other codes appear to strongly indicate that Gaelic football originated as a hybrid of Australian Football and Association Football. Like Australian Football, this was in an effort to differentiate from rugby and was primarily based on the Victorian Rules of 1866 and 1877. For example early codified Gaelic called for Australian rules style behind posts (not present in caid and later removed) with 5 point goals scoring (later changed to 3) and 1 point "behind"s all borrowed from Australian Rules, and Rule 27 in reference to kicking styles, Rule 15 relating to foul play and rules dictating playing equipment appear to be directly borrowed from the Victorian Rules. Early Victorian Rules was played with also a round ball until the introduction of the Sherrin in the 1880s. Other than the directly copied rules, analysts argue that so many of the rules are so similar to the Victorian Rules that the GAA must have obtained a deep knowledge of these laws. In any case the Irish game has been gradually evolving closer the Australian game since and as recently as 2017 with the GAA's introduced "the mark" from Australian Football, one of the game's other distinctive to encourage more spectacular aerial contests.

The Australian High Commissioner to Ireland, Mr Mulrooney of the Canberra Australian Football Association attempted to introduce Australian Football to Dublin in 1946.

The similarity between the codes eventually raised the awareness in Ireland of the Australian sport. Certainly this awareness has grown substantially since the first International rules football tests took place in late 1967, however Aussie Rules was not officially played in Ireland until clubs were simultaneously formed in Dublin and Belfast in 1999.

Australian Football World Tour

In 1967, Harry Beitzel drew inspiration from watching the 1966 All-Ireland Senior Football Championship final on television and formed an Australian side, nicknamed "The Galahs", to play the game against an Irish side.  The next year he organised the Australian Football World Tour, a six-match series with games played against Irish teams in Ireland, the United Kingdom and United States of America.  What followed was the beginning of regular interaction between the two codes which was to become the hybrid code of International rules football played in both countries and facilitating the cross code competition.

Irish experiment

Ron Barassi, drawing comparisons between Australian rules football and Gaelic football was of the opinion that Gaelic footballers could provide a previously untapped pool of potential Australian Rules players. As a result, wealthy Victorian clubs were scouting Ireland for new talent.  In 1982, Barassi (then the Melbourne VFL club coach) and his recruiting team including Melbourne's Barry Richardson travelled to Ireland, looking for young, tall, and talented players.  Over the following years, a number of Irish athletes made the journey to Australia to play professionally in Australia. Players were found not only from Gaelic football codes, but other sports including hurling and rugby. Some, including Jim Stynes, Tadgh Kennelly and Martin Clarke, achieved a level of fame in Ireland either going on to careers in Australia or returning home to achieve success in their sports at home and along with the International Rules Series, increase the profile and awareness of the Australian game.

Formation of the ARFLI and national team
Two clubs, in Dublin and Belfast, recruited and trained through the winter of 1999 and played a number of British Aussie rules clubs in challenge matches in early spring 2000. The Australian Rules Football League of Ireland (ARFLI) was formed in October 2000 after the first ever Irish Grand Final was contested between them. The following year, players from the clubs were drawn to form the first national team.

Growth and expansion
In the 2010s, the women's game grew rapidly and the first national team was established and players began to make their way to women's leagues in Australia.

By 2014, the league had grown to more than 200 players and expanded to six men's clubs and three women's clubs.

National teams

An Irish National Aussie rules team, drawn from all ARFLI affiliated clubs headed to London between 6–15 October to take part in the Atlantic Alliance Cup 2001 – a five nations International competition with United States, Canada, Great Britain and Denmark providing the opposition. A final panel of 24 players, whittled down from 60 over a three-month training period made the trip. Ireland, playing their first ever competitive International matches, won all their games in the round robin series and went on to record a win against Denmark (pre-tournament favourites) in the Grand Final. This was a huge achievement for such a young league against teams from leagues that had been established for ten years plus. Darren Fitzpatrick of Kilkenny, who previously played Aussie Rules at a professional level with the Western Bulldogs in Australia, coached the team.

In August 2002, the National team attended the Australian Football International Cup (an Amateur World Cup for nations outside of Australia). The team went into the competition as third seeds behind Papua New Guinea and New Zealand. The competition was a success for Ireland as they beat Canada, Samoa, USA, South Africa and New Zealand in the group stage and went on to beat PNG in a televised final at the Melbourne Cricket Ground. The team which was again coached by Darren Fitzpatrick, and was captained by Michael Johnston.

In 2005, the "Green Machine" again attended the Australian Football International Cup. With injuries and late withdrawals, the team managed a fourth place behind New Zealand, Papua New Guinea and USA.

Jim Stynes' brother David coached the 2014 national side hoping to defend the title however the side failed to defeat Papua New Guinea in the final.

The men's side was considered favourites going into the 2017 international cup, thought they finished in 3rd place.

Governing body and participation
The governing body is AFL Ireland. Formerly it was the Australian Rules Football League of Ireland (ARFLI) until the league affiliated with the AFL Commission.

As of 2014, there were more than 200 senior players and in 6 men's clubs and 3 women's clubs.

Media coverage
The sport, and International Rules has been covered in the media for many years, though it was only in 2010 that there has been regular AFL coverage on television through TG4. The and also in the media, including the International Rules Series. In 2021 the AFLW began showing on TG4.

Current issues
The sport in Ireland faces constant struggle, due to the massive popularity of the indigenous and similar sport of Gaelic football which discourages professionalism.

A controversial International Rules series in 2005 may have irreparably damaged the reputation of the code in Ireland, however the continued export of Gaelic football converts to Aussie Rules ensures that the sport continues to have a small following in Ireland.

Proximity to Great Britain and mainland Europe, where there are fairly strong Aussie Rules leagues gives teams from Ireland the opportunity to regularly participate in international competition and remain competitive through access to Gaelic football players.

Players

Australia has recruited several Irish Gaelic footballers to play Aussie Rules. As Gaelic football is primarily amateur competition and the AFL competition is professional, there is a strong financial lure.

Converts have included Jim Stynes, Sean Wight, Tadhg Kennelly and Setanta Ó hAilpín (hurler).

Leagues
Australian Rules Football League of Ireland

See also

List of Australian rules football leagues outside Australia

References

External links